Flagstaff Park is a park in Cambridge, Massachusetts, United States.

A two-way path for bicyclists and pedestrians was added in 2016.

References

External links
 
 Cambridge Common/Flagstaff Park Project, Community Development Department, City of Cambridge, Massachusetts
 CAMBRIDGE COMMON/FLAGSTAFF PARK IMPROVEMENTS, Harvard Square Business Association

Geography of Cambridge, Massachusetts
Parks in Massachusetts
Tourist attractions in Cambridge, Massachusetts